FC Khimik Vanadzor, is a defunct Armenian football club from the city of Vanadzor, Lori Province.

The club was founded in 1950, representing the Kirovakan chemicals plant. The team won the Armenian SSR championship in 1955 and 1964.

However, the club was dissolved in 1993, after the independence of Armenia.

References

Khimik Vanadzor
Association football clubs established in 1950
Association football clubs disestablished in 1993
1950 establishments in Armenia
1993 disestablishments in Armenia